An ALPSA (anterior labral periosteal sleeve avulsion) lesion is an injury at the front of the shoulder associated with shoulder dislocation.

Anatomy

The shoulder joint is made up of the glenoid and humeral head.  The humeral head is ball-shaped but the glenoid is more dish-shaped than cup-shaped.  To aid stability of the joint, the glenoid has a soft tissue bumper around its edge (the labrum) which acts as a bumper preventing dislocation of the head from the glenoid.

Pathology

The anterior (front) labrum can peel off the glenoid resulting in a Bankart lesion.  When the periosteum (fibrous tissue surrounding bone) peels off as well this is called an ALPSA lesion.  When this happens the labrum (bumper) falls away and rolls up.  It normally falls medially and downwards.

Treatment

If required, the labrum and periosteum can be reattached, recreating the bumper affect, aiding shoulder stability and hopefully preventing further dislocation.  It can be done by Arthroscopic techniques or with open surgery. The injury cannot always be repaired.

References

Dislocations, sprains and strains
Shoulder
Lesion